Ilya Bolotowsky (July 1, 1907 – November 22, 1981) was a leading early 20th-century Russian-American painter in abstract styles in New York City. His work, a search for philosophical order through visual expression, embraced cubism and geometric abstraction and was influenced by Dutch painter Piet Mondrian.

Biography
Born to Jewish parents in St. Petersburg, Russia, Bolotowsky lived in Baku and Constantinople before immigrating to the United States in 1923, where he settled in New York City. He attended the National Academy of Design. He became associated with a group called "The Ten Whitney Dissenters" or simply "The Ten", a group of artists including Louis Schanker, Adolph Gottlieb, Mark Rothko, Ben-Zion, and Joseph Solman who rebelled against the strictures of the Academy and held independent exhibitions.

Bolotowsky was strongly influenced by Dutch painter Piet Mondrian and the tenets of De Stijl, a movement that advocated the possibility of ideal order in the visual arts. Bolotowsky adopted Mondrian's use of horizontal and vertical geometric pattern and a palette restricted to primary colors and neutrals.

Having turned to geometric abstractions, in 1936 Bolotowsky co-founded American Abstract Artists, a cooperative formed to promote the interests of abstract painters and to increase understanding between themselves and the public.

Bolotowsky's 1936 mural for the Williamsburg Housing Project in Brooklyn was one of the first abstract murals done under the Federal Art Project.

In the 1960s, he began making three-dimensional forms, usually vertical and straight-sided. Bolotowsky's work was exhibited at the University of New Mexico in 1970.

Bolotowsky's first solo museum show was in 1974 at New York City's Guggenheim Museum and went on to the National Collection of Fine Arts.

His work has been exhibited at the Anita Shapolsky Gallery in New York City.

A Bolotowsky painting bought at a North Carolina Goodwill store for $9.99 was auctioned at  Sotheby's in September 2012 for $34,375.

Teaching

Bolotowsky taught at Black Mountain College from 1946 to 1948. The artists Kenneth Noland and Ruth Asawa were among his students. He taught humanities and fine arts at the Southampton, New York campus of Long Island University, the State University of New York at New  Paltz, the University of Wisconsin, Whitewater, and the University of New Mexico.

Collections
 The Governor Nelson A. Rockefeller Empire State Plaza Art Collection
 Metropolitan Museum of Art
 Museum of Modern Art
 Smithsonian American Art Museum
 Black Mountain College Museum + Arts Center

References

External links

List of artworks by Ilya Bolotowsky at The Smithsonian American Art Museum
 American Abstract Artists
Ilya Bolotowsky Bio - Findlay Galleries
 Vivien Raynor. Art: Ilya Borotowsky. New York Times, February 4, 1983

1907 births
1981 deaths
20th-century American painters
American male painters
People from Baku
Painters from New York City
American muralists
Jewish American artists
Jewish painters
Soviet emigrants to the United States
Jews from the Russian Empire
National Academy of Design alumni
Black Mountain College faculty
Long Island University faculty
Federal Art Project artists
20th-century American printmakers
20th-century American Jews
20th-century American male artists
Members of the American Academy of Arts and Letters